William Glennie (7 April 1761 – 7 January 1828) was a teacher to Lord Byron and father to a number of Australian pioneers.

Early life
He was born 1761 in Drumoak, Aberdeenshire, the son of John Glennie and Jean Mitchell. He married Mary Gardiner in 1794 at St. Mary Magdalene Church in Richmond, Surrey. He and Mary had a large family of twelve, four of whom became Australian Pioneers (James, Henry, Alfred and Benjamin). He died in 1828 in Sandgate, Kent.

Career

He was the teacher to Byron from August 1799 to April 1801, at his 'academy' in Dulwich Grove. The academy had originally been a Tavern called The Green Man, and had been converted by 1815. He was also a friend of the poet Thomas Campbell.

References

1761 births
1828 deaths
People from Kincardine and Mearns
Scottish schoolteachers
18th-century Scottish people